Mount Holly Park was a summer resort developed along Mountain Creek in Mount Holly Springs, Pennsylvania. The park opened in 1901, but went into decline from 1918, and closed .

History
Mount Holly Park was originally opened in 1901 by Harrisburg entrepreneur Patricio Russ, serving as the attraction for his "Trolley to Holly" line. The park began near the Holly Inn and continued south for approximately 1 mile along Mountain Creek.

In 1904, Russ leased additional property, including an artificial lake. The lake was originally created in the 1880s by damming Mountain Creek and had been used to supply water and generate power for the nearby paper mills. Russ extended the trolley line to provide direct access to the lake. Visitors would disembark near the present-day Deer Lodge restaurant, and the park ran along the road connected to the restaurant's parking lot.

The trolley line peaked in 1906 with a maximum ridership of 212,605 passengers. Thousands of people attended events at the park, such as the Harvest Home Picnic of Cumberland County.

Attractions
 Restaurant
 Bandstand -- located on the creek
 Dance Pavilion -- measured approximately 80 feet long by 40 feet wide, different kinds of dances were held depending on the day of the week
 Bowling Alley
 Ferris Wheel -- the first Ferris wheel in Cumberland County
 Roller Coaster
 Observatory -- located at the top of South Mountain, featured a telescope
 Baseball Field
 Tennis Courts
 Flower Gardens
 Mineral Springs -- noted at the time for having health benefits
 Boating
 Dining Area
 Hiking Trails

Rollercoaster Fatality
In 1912, Thomas Blair of Newville, PA was killed when he stood up on the rollercoaster and fell out of his car. Another car crashed into the car he had been occupying, crushing Blair's breastbone and jaws. He died later at a local hospital.

This accident prompted the closure of the ride, and contributed to the closure of the park itself.

Closure
The popularity of Mount Holly Park decreased with the increased adoption of personal automobiles, the onset of the Great Depression, the rollercoaster fatality, and damage to the dam due to flooding. Trolley service in Carlisle and Mount Holly Springs ended December 1, 1930.

It is still possible to view the remains of the restaurant's foundation, one of the springs, and the upper and lower dams. The upper dam was demolished in 1989, but the concrete spillway foundations and earthen wall remain.

Mount Holly Springs Marsh Preserve
The property today is known as The Mount Holly Marsh Preserve. It was acquired by The Nature Conservancy in 1992 with help from the Holly Gap Committee, a group of local community members who raised funds to permanently preserve the land. Cumberland County currently owns the land, managing it in cooperation with The Nature Conservancy. Activities within the preserve include hiking (with over 7 miles of trails) and bird watching.

References

External links 
Carlisle and Mount Holly Trolley presented by Randy Watts - a video about the trolley line which includes images and information about the park

Closed amusement parks
Amusement parks closed in 1928
Amusement parks in Pennsylvania
Defunct amusement parks in Pennsylvania
1901 establishments in Pennsylvania
Cumberland County, Pennsylvania